Return of the Mac is a 2007 album by American rapper Prodigy.

Return of the Mac may also refer to:

Return of the Mac (TV series), a 2017 television series starring Joey McIntyre
Return of the Mack (album), by Mark Morrison (1996)
"Return of the Mack", a single from the album